The 1987 Orange Bowl was the 53rd edition of the college football bowl game, played at the Orange Bowl in Miami, Florida, on Thursday, January 1. Part of the 1986–87 bowl game season, it matched the ninth-ranked  Arkansas Razorbacks of the Southwest Conference (SWC) and the #3 Oklahoma Sooners of the Big Eight Conference. Heavily-favored Oklahoma won 42–8.

Teams

Arkansas

The Razorbacks lost twice, to Texas Tech and Baylor. This was Arkansas' first Orange Bowl appearance in nine years; that 1978 game was a 31–6 upset rout of Oklahoma.

Oklahoma

The Sooners won the Big Eight Conference title for the third straight year and appeared in a third consecutive Orange Bowl. Only a 28–16 loss at Miami in late September cost them a shot at a second straight title. Standout linebacker Brian Bosworth was suspended for this game after testing positive for steroids.

Game summary
The game followed the Rose Bowl on NBC, and kicked off around 8:30 p.m. EST; it was the sole game in that time slot, as the Sugar Bowl was played earlier in the day on ABC.

Following a scoreless first quarter, Spencer Tillman gave Oklahoma the lead in the second quarter with two touchdown runs, the latter occurring after an Arkansas turnover, and it was 14–0 at halftime. Quarterback Jamelle Holieway added his own two touchdown runs to make it 28–0 after three quarters. Arkansas threw five interceptions, as Anthony Stafford and Duncan Parham added touchdown runs of their own to make it 42–0 for Oklahoma. In the final half-minute, Arkansas scored on a one-yard touchdown run by fullback Derrick Thomas (and a two-point conversion) to avoid a shutout.

Scoring
First quarter
No scoring
Second quarter
Oklahoma – Spencer Tillman 77-yard run (Tim Lashar kick)
Oklahoma – Tillman 21-yard run (Lashar kick)
Third quarter
Oklahoma – Jamelle Holieway 2-yard run (Lashar kick)
Oklahoma – Holieway 4-yard run (Lashar kick)
Fourth quarter
Oklahoma – Anthony Stafford 13-yard run (Lashar kick)
Oklahoma – Duncan Parham 49-yard run (Lashar kick)
Arkansas – Derrick Thomas 1-yard run (James Shibest pass from John Bland)

Statistics
{| class=wikitable style="text-align:center"
! Statistics !! Arkansas !! Oklahoma
|-
|align=left|First Downs || 17|| 11
|-
|align=left|Rushes–yards|| 45–48|| 48–366
|-
|align=left|Passing yards || 192 || 47 
|-
|align=left|Passes (C–A–I) || 16–33–5 || 2–5–0
|-
|align=left|Total Offense || 78–240 || 53–413
|-
|align=left|Return yards ||18|| 58
|-
|align=left|Punts–average ||9–41||5–47
|-
|align=left|Fumbles–lost ||2–0|| 3–2
|-
|align=left|Turnovers||5||2
|-
|align=left|Penalties–yards ||3–25||4–40
|-
|align=left|Time of possession ||35:29||24:31
|}

Aftermath
While on the sidelines, Bosworth displayed a shirt referring to the NCAA as "National Communists Against Athletes." After this game, he was dismissed from the team, and later declared himself eligible for the NFL supplemental draft in June, where he was selected by the Seattle Seahawks.

In the final AP poll, Oklahoma remained at third and Arkansas fell to fifteenth.

Oklahoma returned to the Orange Bowl the next year for a fourth consecutive appearance, but through , Arkansas has not been back.

References

Orange Bowl
Orange Bowl
Arkansas Razorbacks football bowl games
Oklahoma Sooners football bowl games
January 1987 sports events in the United States
Orange